Román Aureliano Torres Morcillo (born 20 March 1986) is a Panamanian professional footballer who plays as a defender for the Dallas Sidekicks in the Major Arena Soccer League, and the Panama national team.

He represented the Panama national team and captained them in their first ever World Cup, where he was regarded as the 'star player' for the national side.

Club career
Torres started his career at Chepo and played alongside compatriot Anthony Basile at Colombian side Cortuluá from January 2006. In January 2007 he moved to La Equidad, where he was joined by compatriot Orlando Rodríguez.

His performances gained him notice with several clubs, particularly with English Championship sides Blackpool and Swansea City during the winter transfer market in 2010. However, a move to England never materialised. He was also on trial for the Championship team Nottingham Forest in December 2011–January 2012, impressing manager, Steve Cotterill. However, this move also failed to materialize.

Millonarios FC
More recently, his continued good form at Millonarios FC caused Roman to be linked with a move to Brazilian side Palmeiras, though this too failed to materialize.

He was a champion of the Colombian national football tournament Liga Postobón II 2012 with Millonarios FC, for whom he played over 100 matches.

Seattle Sounders FC

On 12 August 2015, Torres signed with American club Seattle Sounders FC. He made his debut for the club on 18 August, during a 4–0 win over Orlando City SC in Seattle.

During a match on 12 September against the San Jose Earthquakes, Torres suffered a knee injury that resulted in him being substituted at half-time. It was later revealed to be an anterior cruciate ligament injury, forcing Torres to miss the rest of the season for surgery and rehabilitation. Torres returned to team training in June 2016 and made his full return on 28 August during a match against the Portland Timbers.

On 10 December 2016, Torres scored the Cup-winning penalty in a shoot-out against Toronto FC to win the MLS Cup, the first in Sounders history.

On 2 August 2019, Torres was suspended for ten matches after testing positive for a performance-enhancing substance by the league. He was also fined one-fifth of his salary.

Inter Miami
On 29 December 2019, it was announced that Torres had joined Inter Miami ahead of their inaugural season in MLS in 2020.

Return to Seattle Sounders
On September 28, 2020, Torres was traded back to Seattle Sounders FC.

Cartagines, Costa Rican League
In January 2021, Torres signed with Costa Rican club C.S. Cartaginés.

Dallas Sidekicks
Torres signed with the Dallas Sidekicks of the Major Arena Soccer League on 3 February 2023.

International career
Torres was a member of the Panama U-20 squad that took part in the 2005 FIFA World Youth Cup in the Netherlands.

Torres has made 119 appearances for the full Panama national team, including qualifying matches for the 2006, 2010, 2014 and 2018 World Cup. He made his debut at the 2005 CONCACAF Gold Cup against South Africa on 17 July 2005. He also made three appearances at the 2007 CONCACAF Gold Cup.

While captaining the Panamanian squad in the semi-final match of the 2015 CONCACAF Gold Cup Torres scored the first goal of the match on a header. His team, down a man based on a red card awarded by the referee, lost the match in extra time after Torres was called for a handball late in regulation.

On 10 October 2017, during the final qualifying match for the 2018 FIFA World Cup, Torres scored the game-winning goal against Costa Rica with three minutes left in the game, which combined with the United States' loss to Trinidad and Tobago, helped Panama qualify for their first ever World Cup, making him a national hero.

Torres was named in Panama's 23-man squad for the 2018 World Cup in Russia.
Before Panama's final game in the 2018 World Cup against Tunisia, Torres announced his official retirement from the national side. Torres achieved his dream of helping Panama reach the country's first ever World Cup.

However he has since backtracked from his statement, accepting a call-up for a friendly against Venezuela in September 2018, and was included in Panama's squad for the 2019 CONCACAF Gold Cup.

Career statistics

International

International goals
Scores and results list Panama's goal tally first.

Personal life
Torres earned a U.S. green card in February 2018, which also qualifies him as a domestic player for MLS roster purposes. He has a son named, Adriano Torres who was born in 2008. Currently, his son is going to middle school as of 2019.

Honours

Chepo
Copa Rommel Fernández: 2003

San Francisco
Liga Panameña de Futbol: 2005 Clausura, 2006 Apertura

La Equidad
Copa Colombia: 2008

Atlético Junior
Categoría Primera A: 2010 Apertura

Atlético Nacional
Categoría Primera A: 2011 Apertura

Millonarios
Categoría Primera A: 2012 Finalización

Seattle Sounders FC
MLS Cup: 2016, 2019

Panama
Copa Centroamericana: 2009; runner-up: 2007
CONCACAF Gold Cup runner-up: 2005, 2013

Individual
CONCACAF Best XI: 2015, 2017

See also
List of men's footballers with 100 or more international caps

References

External links

1986 births
Living people
Sportspeople from Panama City
Association football defenders
Panamanian footballers
Panama international footballers
Panamanian expatriate footballers
Chepo FC players
San Francisco F.C. players
Cortuluá footballers
La Equidad footballers
Atlético Junior footballers
Atlético Nacional footballers
Millonarios F.C. players
Seattle Sounders FC players
Tacoma Defiance players
Inter Miami CF players
Expatriate footballers in Colombia
Expatriate soccer players in the United States
Panamanian expatriate sportspeople in Colombia
Panamanian expatriate sportspeople in the United States
2005 CONCACAF Gold Cup players
2007 UNCAF Nations Cup players
2007 CONCACAF Gold Cup players
2009 CONCACAF Gold Cup players
2011 Copa Centroamericana players
2011 CONCACAF Gold Cup players
2013 Copa Centroamericana players
2013 CONCACAF Gold Cup players
2014 Copa Centroamericana players
2015 CONCACAF Gold Cup players
Liga Panameña de Fútbol players
Categoría Primera A players
Major League Soccer players
FIFA Century Club
2018 FIFA World Cup players
USL Championship players
2019 CONCACAF Gold Cup players